Willmott is a surname. It may refer to:

The Willmott family of British Olympic swimmers, including:
Aimee Willmott (born 1993)
Carrie Willmott (born 1975)
Jacquelene Willmott (born 1965)
Stuart Willmott (born 1964)
Chris Willmott (born 1977), English footballer
Deidre Willmott (born ?), Australian lawyer and public servant
Ellen Willmott (1858–1934), English horticulturist
Ernest Willmot Sloper (born Ernest Willmott; 1871–1916), British-born South African architect
Francis Willmott (1870–1941), British-born Australian politician and farmer
Francis Drake Willmott (1904–2004), Australian politician and farmer
Glenis Willmott (born 1951), English politician
Harold Willmott (1899–1993), South African military commander
Hugh Willmott (born 1950), British academic
Hugh Willmott (archaeologist) (born 1972), British archaeologist and academic
Kevin Willmott (born 1959), American film director, screenwriter, and professor
Leonard Willmott (1921–1993), British soldier of World War II
Maurice Willmott (1894–1977) British High Court judge
Peter Willmott (businessman) (born ?), American business executive
Peter Willmott (sociologist) (1923–2000), British sociologist 
Phil Willmott (born 1968), British director, playwright, arts journalist, and teacher
Robbie Willmott (born 1990), English footballer
Robert Aris Willmott (1809–1863), English cleric and author
Tom Willmott (born 1960), American politician, attorney, and registered nurse
Trevor Willmott (born 1950), British Anglican bishop
William Willmott (1895–1947), Australian politician

See also
James Willmott-Brown, a fictional character in the soap opera EastEnders
Wilmot (surname)